Semper Femina is the sixth studio album by British singer-songwriter, Laura Marling, and was released on 10 March 2017, on More Alarming Records. The album was produced by Blake Mills. The album's title is taken from the song "Nouel".

Themes
Described by Alexis Petridis of The Guardian as a "concept album about femininity and female relationships", the title Semper Femina, borrowed from the ancient poet Virgil, is an expression from a longer line of Latin poetry, which roughly translates to “woman is ever a fickle and changeable thing".

Reception

Semper Femina received critical acclaim upon its release. At Metacritic, which assigns a normalised rating out of 100 to reviews from mainstream publications, the album received an average score of 85, based on 31 reviews.

The album earned Marling a Grammy Award for Best Folk Album nomination.

Accolades
In The Village Voices Pazz & Jop, a poll regarding the best albums of the year as voted by more than 400 American music critics, Semper Femina tied with Valerie June's The Order of Time (2017) at the 89th spot, both LPs garnering 84 points.

Track listing

Personnel
Musicians
Laura Marling – vocals, guitar
Matt Ingram – drums
Nick Pini – bass
Pete Randall – guitar
Blake Mills – guitar
Rob Moose – strings, arrangements
Matt Chamberlain – additional drums
Sebastian Steinberg – additional bass

Charts

References

2017 albums
Albums produced by Blake Mills
Concept albums
Laura Marling albums